Truth in Accounting (TIA), formerly known as the Institute for Truth in Accounting, is an American think tank that promotes fiscal transparency and accountability.  Its stated goal is "to educate and empower citizens with understandable, reliable, and transparent government financial information."

Publications  
Each September, TIA releases its "Financial State of States" report that takes a deep look into each of the 50 states' Comprehensive Annual Financial Report (CAFR) in order to compare assets with liabilities. "For the first time, a detailed analysis of pension and health care liabilities has exposed all fifty states’ actual obligations," commented Ziyi Mai in The John Locke Foundation's blog, The Locker Room. TIA then ranks the 50 states on the basis of taxpayer burden, which is each taxpayer's share of state debt.

TIA expanded on its state-level analysis in 2015, moving its analysis to include city-level governments. So far, TIA has analyzed and ranked the twenty largest US cities. By the end of 2016, it had analyzed the 50 largest US cities.

Reception 

TIA has been quoted in numerous publications covering federal and state-level government accounting issues. USA Today quoted TIA CEO Weinberg in 2012, saying, "By law, the federal government can't tell the truth [about its debt]." USA Today also quoted Weinberg in 2011: "The (federal) debt only tells us what the government owes to the public. It doesn't take into account what's owed to seniors, veterans and retired employees. Without accurate accounting, we can't make good decisions."

Kevin Palmer at Watchdog Wire reported on TIA's methodology: "Truth In Accounting’s figure includes not only this public debt, but also intergovernmental debts (loans made from one government branch or agency to another) and unfunded liabilities, the greatest of which are Social Security, Medicare, and pensions. As the population ages, these unfunded liabilities have skyrocketed–and although they aren’t yet part of our official debt, barring substantial reform the government will have no choice but to borrow trillions in order to fulfill them."

Politifact, after analyzing a TIA report claiming that taxpayers in Georgia would have to send $5,000 each to the state treasury to cover the debt, determined that it was "mostly false".

Data-Z 

In November 2012, Truth in Accounting launched a new website called Data-Z, which provides easy access to its calculations of the states' debt, liabilities, and assets and permits users to graph and analyze it visually. Data-Z also posts news about state-level financial issues, including pensions and retiree health insurance.

See also 
 American Legislative Exchange Council
 Tax Foundation
 State Policy Network
 Heartland Institute

References

External links
 

Accounting organizations
501(c)(3) organizations
Organizations based in Illinois